Barrow is a civil parish in Cheshire West and Chester, England. It contains 13 buildings that are recorded in the National Heritage List for England as designated listed buildings. Other than the settlements of Great Barrow and Little Barrow, the parish is entirely rural. Apart from the church, a sundial, and a war memorial, all the listed buildings are domestic or related to farming.

Key

Buildings

See also

Listed buildings in Ashton Hayes
Listed buildings in Christleton
Listed buildings in Dunham on the Hill
Listed buildings in Guilden Sutton
Listed buildings in Hapsford
Listed buildings in Horton cum Peel
Listed buildings in Manley
Listed buildings in Mickle Trafford
Listed buildings in Mouldsworth
Listed buildings in Tarvin

References
Citations

Sources

Listed buildings in Cheshire West and Chester
Lists of listed buildings in Cheshire